The men's 4 × 200 metre freestyle relay competition at the 2006 Pan Pacific Swimming Championships took place on August 18 at the Saanich Commonwealth Place.  The last champion was Australia.

This race consisted of sixteen lengths of the pool. Each of the four swimmers completed four lengths of the pool. The first swimmer had to touch the wall before the second could leave the starting block.

Records
Prior to this competition, the existing world and Pan Pacific records were as follows:

Results
All times are in minutes and seconds.

Heats
Heats weren't performed, as only seven teams had entered.

Final 
The final was held on August 18, at 20:10.

References

4 × 200 metre freestyle relay
2006 Pan Pacific Swimming Championships